The 1902 Highland Park Bridge was a cantilever through truss that carried two streetcar tracks across the Allegheny River and Sixmile Island between the Pittsburgh neighborhood of Highland Park and Sharpsburg, Pennsylvania. It was replaced by the Highland Park Bridge in 1938.

Location
The bridge was erected in two sections, with the cantilever on the Pittsburgh side of Sixmile Island and a truss bridge on the Sharpsburg side. However, contemporary maps and pictures imply that the island has moved almost its entire length downstream, making the bridge location the current (2010) upstream end of the island.

References

Bridges over the Allegheny River
Bridges completed in 1902
Bridges in Pittsburgh
Cantilever bridges in the United States